Ronny Philp (born 28 January 1989) is a Romanian former professional footballer who played as a defender. Philp holds German nationality.

Career 
Philp was born in Sibiu, Romania, and made his professional debut in the opening fixture of the 2011–12 3. Liga season for Jahn Regensburg at home to SV Babelsberg 03.

He retired from playing in February 2021 due to injury problems and started a trading apprenticeship at former club Greuther Fürth.

References

External links 
 
 

1989 births
Living people
Sportspeople from Sibiu
Romanian footballers
German footballers
German people of German-Romanian descent
Romanian emigrants to Germany
Association football defenders
Bundesliga players
2. Bundesliga players
3. Liga players
Regionalliga players
SpVgg Greuther Fürth players
SSV Jahn Regensburg players
FC Augsburg players
1. FC Heidenheim players
1. FC Schweinfurt 05 players
Romanian expatriate footballers
Romanian expatriate sportspeople in Germany
Expatriate footballers in Germany